Portrait of Joachim Murat is an 1808 oil on canvas painting of Joachim Murat by François Gérard, now in Room 54 of the National Museum of Capodimonte. It shows its subject in the pose of Michelangelo's David and was commissioned by him after his accession to the throne of the Two Sicilies for the Palace of Portici. It is a replica of a painting commissioned for the Diana Gallery at the Tuileries Palace, later moved to the Palace of Versailles.

References

19th-century portraits
Portraits of men
Portraits by French artists
Paintings by François Gérard
Portrait of Joachim Murat
Portrait of Joachim Murat
Joachim Murat